The year 1966 was the 185th year of the Rattanakosin Kingdom of Thailand. It was the 21st year in the reign of King Bhumibol Adulyadej (Rama IX), and is reckoned as year 2509 in the Buddhist Era.

Incumbents
King: Bhumibol Adulyadej 
Crown Prince: (vacant)
Prime Minister: Thanom Kittikachorn
Supreme Patriarch: Ariyavongsagatanana V

Events

October
27-30 October - His Majesty King Bhumibol Adulyadej welcomed U.S. President Lyndon Johnson for a State Visit.

December
9-20 December - The 1966 Asian Games are held in Bangkok.

 
Years of the 20th century in Thailand
Thailand
Thailand
1960s in Thailand